Arlington Cemetery is a side platformed Washington Metro station in Arlington, Virginia, United States. The station was opened on July 1, 1977, and is operated by the Washington Metropolitan Area Transit Authority (WMATA). The station provides service for only the Blue Line, and is located at the entrance to Arlington National Cemetery, underneath Memorial Drive. There is no public parking near the station except at the cemetery, which is reserved for cemetery visitors. It is the only station that closes earlier than the rest of the system, closing at 7 PM from October to March, and 10 PM from April to September.

The station is one of three stations to be exclusively serviced by the Blue Line. The rest of the Blue Line's stations are shared with the Yellow Line to the south (except for two of the southernmost stations), and with the Silver Line and Orange Line to the north.

History

The station opened on July 1, 1977.

In May 2018, Metro announced an extensive renovation of platforms at twenty stations across the system. The platforms at the Arlington Cemetery station would be rebuilt between February 13 to May 23, 2021.

On March 19, 2020, this station closed in response to the COVID-19 pandemic. The station reopened on August 23, 2020.

Between January 15 to January 21, 2021, this station was closed because of security concerns related to the 2021 Inauguration.

Station layout 
Arlington Cemetery is unique in its design, located just below ground level and only covered by a bridge carrying Memorial Drive. Escalators from Memorial Drive go down two levels to the mezzanine, where customers may purchase SmarTrip cards at vending machines and pass through fare control. Escalators on the other side of fare control then go up to the side platforms. Elevators go directly to the platforms with one fare gate for each elevator at platform level.

Notable places nearby 
 Arlington House (also known as the Custis-Lee Mansion)
 Arlington Memorial Bridge
 Arlington National Cemetery
 Lincoln Memorial
 Tomb of the Unknown Soldier
 Women in Military Service for America Memorial

References

External links
 

 The Schumin Web Transit Center: Arlington Cemetery Station
 Memorial Drive entrance from Google Maps Street View

Arlington National Cemetery
Stations on the Blue Line (Washington Metro)
Transportation in Arlington County, Virginia
Washington Metro stations in Virginia
Railway stations in the United States opened in 1977
1977 establishments in Virginia